Year 1101 (MCI) was a common year starting on Tuesday (link will display the full calendar) of the Julian calendar. It was the 2nd year of the 1100s decade, and the 1st year of the 12th century.

Events 
 By place 

 Byzantine Empire 
 Crusade of 1101: A second wave of European crusaders attempts to cross Anatolia, to reach the Kingdom of Jerusalem. They are defeated by the Seljuk troops under Sultan Kilij Arslan I, at Heraclea. A handful of crusaders under Raymond IV (Saint-Gilles) manage to reach the Byzantine port of Bafra, at the mouth of the River Halys.
 Summer – The Byzantine fleet under Admiral Eustathios recaptures the ports of western Cilicia, Seleucia and Corycus. Eustathios extends his power over Cilician territory (belonging to Bohemond I) further east – occupying Tarsus, Adana and Mamistra.

 Levant 
 Spring – King Baldwin I concludes an alliance with the Genoese fleet, offering them commercial privileges and booty. He captures the towns of Arsuf and Caesarea. Baldwin's crusaders pillage Caesarea and massacre the majority of the local population.
 September 7 – Battle of Ramla: A Crusader force (some 1,100 men) under Baldwin I defeats the invading Fatimids at Ramla (modern Israel). Baldwin plunders the Fatimid camp and the survivors flee to Ascalon.

 Europe 
 June 22 – Roger I (Bosso), count of Sicily, dies at Mileto in Calabria after a 30-year reign. He is succeeded by his 8-year-old son Simon of Hauteville, while his mother, Adelaide del Vasto, acts as his regent. 
 Summer – Almoravid forces under Sultan Yusuf ibn Tashfin besiege Valencia, which is defended by Jimena Díaz, widow of Rodrigo Diaz de Vivar (El Cid). The city holds out until May 1102.
 Autumn – Countess Mathilda of Tuscany leads a successful expedition in northern Italy and takes Ferrara.
 The county of Berg in Germany is established.

 England 
 February 3 – Ranulf Flambard, bishop of Durham, escapes from the Tower of London and flees to Normandy. There he joins Robert II (Curthose), duke of Normandy, who has just returned from the Crusades.
 Summer – Robert II lands at Portsmouth with an army in an effort to take the throne from his brother, King Henry I. He is forced to sign the Treaty of Alton, giving up his claim to the English throne.

 By topic 

 Culture 
 A vast compilation of Liao, Korean, and Song Buddhist writings is completed (approximate date).

 Religion 
 Spring – Antipope Theodoric dies, the partisans of Emperor Henry IV choose Adalbert (or Albert) as the new antipope. 
 April 19 – King Canute IV (the Holy) of Denmark is canonized as a saint under the name San Canuto.
 Fontevraud Abbey is founded by the French preacher Robert of Arbrissel.

Births 
 Abu al-Bayan ibn al-Mudawwar, Jewish physician (d. 1184)
 Arslan Shah I, Seljuk sultan of Kerman (d. 1142)
 Artaldus (or Arthaud), bishop of Belly-Ars (d. 1206)
 Fujiwara no Tamako, Japanese empress (d. 1145)
 Helena of Skövde, Swedish  noblewoman and saint (d. 1160)
 Ibn Bashkuwāl, Andalusian biographer (d. 1183)
 Stephen II, king of Hungary and Croatia (d. 1131)

Deaths 
 February 12 – Dao Zong, Chinese emperor (b. 1032)
 April 24 – Vseslav of Polotsk, Kievan prince
 May 16 – Liemar, archbishop of Bremen 
 June 22 – Roger I (Bosso), Norman nobleman 
 July 27  
 Conrad II, king of Germany and Italy (b. 1074)
 Hugh d'Avranches, Norman nobleman
 August 24 – Su Shi, Chinese statesman and poet (b. 1037)
 September 30 – Anselm IV, archbishop of Milan
 October 5 – Uicheon, Korean Buddhist monk (b. 1055)
 October 6 – Bruno of Cologne, founder of the Carthusian Order
 October 18 – Hugh I (the Great), son of Henry I (b. 1057)
 November 6 – Welf I, German nobleman
 November 15 – Elvira of Toro, Leonese princess
 December 12 – Al-Musta'li, Fatimid caliph (b. 1074)
 Constantine Bodin, king of Duklja (approximate date)
 Egilbert (or Engelbert), archbishop of Trier
 Fujiwara no Morozane, Japanese nobleman (b. 1042)
 Geldemar Carpenel, French nobleman
 Geoffrey Burel of Amboise, French nobleman
 Gilla na Naemh Ua Dunabhra, Irish chief poet
 Guillaume de Montfort, bishop of Paris
 Ida of Austria, German duchess and crusader
 Nikon the Dry, Kievan monk and hermit
 Qingshui, Chinese Chan Buddhist monk (b. 1047)
 Su Song, Chinese statesman and scientist (b. 1020)
 Theodoric, antipope of the Catholic Church
 Urraca of Zamora, Leonese princess 
 Walter of Albano, Italian cardinal-bishop

References